Lunada is a mountain pass and ski station in the Cantabrian Mountains, in Burgos, Spain. The pass is the origin of the Miera River, one of the main rivers of Cantabria.

References

External links
eslunada.com Official Ski Information

Mountain passes of Spain
Ski areas and resorts in Spain
Geography of the Province of Burgos